The Audi Trophy was a golf tournament on the Challenge Tour. It was played from 1990 to 1993 near Munich then Hamburg in Germany.

The tournament ran parallel to the Audi Quattro Trophy, a Challenge Tour event in Germany 1989–1998.

Winners

See also
Audi Quattro Trophy

References

External links
Coverage on the Challenge Tour's official site

Former Challenge Tour events
Golf tournaments in Germany
Recurring sporting events established in 1990
Recurring sporting events disestablished in 1993